Puzzle is the sixth album by Gianna Nannini. It was released in 1984. The first single from the album, "Fotoromanza", was a summer hit and went on to win the Festivalbar, Vota la Voce and a Gold Telegatto Award. The music video was directed by Michelangelo Antonioni. The album went platinum in Italy, with "Fotoromanza" topping the charts in Italy, Switzerland and Austria.
The European tour to promote the album culminated with a handful of very successful dates in Berlin, at the Montreaux Jazz Festival and in Cologne, resulted in the album Tutto Live (1985).

Track listing

"Kolossal" (Gianna Nannini/Gianna Nannini - R. Riva) – 3:58
"Fotoromanza" (Gianna Nannini - Conny Blank/Gianna Nannini - R. Riva) – 4:27
"L'Urlo" (Rüdiger Braune/Gianna Nannini - R. Riva) – 4:07
"Siamo Ricchi" (Gianna Nannini - M. Paoluzzi/Gianna Nannini - R. Riva) - 4:05
"Ciao" (Gianna Nannini - M. Paoluzzi - Conny Blank/Gianna Nannini - R. Riva) - 4:41
"Fiesta" (Gianna Nannini/Gianna Nannini - R. Riva) – 3:49
"Ballami" (Gianna Nannini/Gianna Nannini - R. Riva) – 4:43
"Se Vai Via" (Gianna Nannini - M. Paoluzzi/Gianna Nannini - R. Riva) - 4:41

Personnel 
Gianna Nannini - Vocals, piano, violin
Hans Bäär - Bass, guitar
Rüdiger Braune - Drums
Claudio Cattafesta - Guitar
Conny Plank - Drums, programming
Pino Scagliarini - Keyboards
Rudy Spinello - Guitar, mandolin
Freddy Steady - Drums
Production: Conny Plank, Gianna Nannini

External links
 Gianna Nannini homepage

1984 albums
Gianna Nannini albums
Albums produced by Conny Plank